400 George is a 5 Star Green Star office building in Brisbane, Queensland, Australia. Construction began in 2006 and was completed in November 2009.

History
The building was designed by architects Cox Rayner. The total cost of the building's construction was $270 million and it provides 43 000 m2 of floor area. The main contractor was Thiess.

Alongside Santos Place and 275 George Street, 400 George forms part of the North Quarter Precinct in Brisbane's CBD. A major feature of this project will be its direct link with the Kurilpa Bridge which extends over the Brisbane River to the Gallery of Modern Art and South Bank cultural precinct. The skyscraper is also located on one of the busiest streets in the CBD, George Street, which forms a majority of the Government Precinct.

The building is near central transport links such as the Roma Street railway station as well as Brisbane's Busway with access at King George Square and Queen Street Mall. The building is also close to major shopping precincts such as Queen Street Mall, Wintergarden and Elizabeth Street all of which feature shopping, restaurants, bars, and nightclubs.

Tenants
Office tenants in the building include Australian Competition & Consumer Commission, Barristers Chambers, Conrad Gargett Riddel Ancher Mortlock Woolley, Cooper Grace Ward Lawyers, Department of Environment and Heritage Protection (Queensland), Department of Justice and Attorney General, Department of Human Services, InterGen, Microsoft, Newcrest, NTI Limited, Smarter Kids, Queensland Reconstruction Authority and Telstra.

In April 2013 a 50% interest in the building was sold to Motor Accident Commission for A$196 million.

See also

List of tallest buildings in Brisbane

References

External links
 

Skyscrapers in Brisbane
Office buildings in Brisbane
Office buildings completed in 2009
George Street, Brisbane
Skyscraper office buildings in Australia
2009 establishments in Australia